Prince Obolensky may refer to:
 Prince Alexander Sergeevich Obolensky (1916–1940), son of Serge Obolensky and Princess Luba and England rugby union international
 Prince Dimitri Alexandrovich Obolensky (1882–1964), Russian landowner
 Prince Dimitri Obolensky (1918–2001), son of Prince Dimitri Alexandrovich Obolensky (1882–1964) and Countess Maria Shuvalov (1894–1973)
 Prince Ivan Mikhailovich Obolensky (1853–1910), Governor-General of Finland

 Prince Michael Alexander Obolensky, American pretender
 Prince Serge Obolensky (1890–1978), husband of Ava Alice Muriel Astor, and son of Platon Obolensky and Marie Narishkin